Mary Louise Milligan Rasmuson (April 11, 1911 – July 30, 2012) was an American army officer, and fifth director of the Women's Army Corps (WAC).

Life and career
Born in East Pittsburgh, Pennsylvania, Milligan graduated with a bachelor's in education from what is now Carnegie Mellon University and received her masters in school administration from University of Pittsburgh. She was one of the first two women who were awarded an honorary doctor of laws degree from Carnegie Mellon. Prior to enlisting in the military, she worked as a secretary, teacher, and assistant principal.

She enlisted in the United States Army during World War II, where she started as a private in an experiment using women as military professionals.

She worked up the ranks, and in 1957, President Dwight Eisenhower appointed Milligan director of the Women's Army Corps and in 1961, President John F. Kennedy reappointed her.
 

She was also instrumental in the integration of black women in the Corps, and was awarded the Legion of Merit award for her work. In five and a half years as director, WAC strength increased from 8,300, on 31 January 1957, to 11,100. The Army had opened twenty-six new military occupational specialties (MOSs) for active duty enlisted women and fifty for WAC reservists. New legislation included a provision to eliminate WAC officer promotion restrictions. Congress had granted active duty credit for WAAC time to women with further military service, and it had corrected inequities for WAC reserve officers. Colonel Rasmuson's public relations efforts enhanced the WAC image and helped convince the public and the Army of the value of WAC service. 

In 1961, she married Elmer E. Rasmuson, the president of National Bank of Alaska. She was the only WAC director to marry while in office. The following year, she retired from the army and moved to Anchorage, Alaska. 

After retiring from the army, Rasmuson helped expand her husband's philanthropic efforts, including supporting civil rights, supporting education and cultural life in Anchorage and beyond. She also became a member of several military organizations and boards of the Alaska Crippled Children's Association, American Cancer Society, Anchorage Fine Arts Commission, and Anchorage March of Dimes.

At age 101, Rasmuson died at her home. She is buried in Anchorage Memorial Park Cemetery.

Television 
She was the first guest contestant on the February 3, 1957 episode of What's My Line? With one answer left, Dorothy Kilgallen correctly identified her occupation. "Are you head of the whole thing?" she asked.

Legacy
The Rasmusons were influential in establishing and greatly expanding the Anchorage Museum.  Her stepdaughter is Connecticut state representative Lile Gibbons.

Notes

Further reading

Willams, Vera S. WAC's: Women's Army Corps. Osceola, WI: Motorbooks International, 1997.

External links
Sen. Begich Joins Alaskans Remembering Mary Louise Rasmuson
Mary Louise Milligan Rasmuson Passes Away at 101 after Many Long Years of Giving 
Former Women's Army Corps commandant dies at age 101
Remembering Mary Louise Rasmuson
Mary Louise Rasmuson, AK philanthropist, armed services pioneer dies at age 101
Alaska philanthropist Mary Louise Rasmuson dies 

1911 births
2012 deaths
People from East Pittsburgh, Pennsylvania
American centenarians
United States Army colonels
Women's Army Corps soldiers
Carnegie Mellon University alumni
Military personnel from Anchorage, Alaska
Military personnel from Pennsylvania
University of Pittsburgh alumni
Women centenarians
United States Army personnel of World War II